Unreleased and Revamped is the second extended play by American hip hop group Cypress Hill. It was released in August 1996. This album was certified Gold by the Recording Industry Association of America.

The EP includes several of their songs of previous albums which have been remixed, along with a few unreleased songs that didn't make the group's previous albums.

Track listing

Samples
Throw Your Hands in the Air
"Leaves" by Pete Jolly
Intellectual Dons
"Pacified" by Rita Jean Bodine
"Your Mother Should Know" by The Beatles
Hand on the Pump (Muggs' Blunted Mix)
"Put Your Head Out" by House of Pain
"Can I Get Some Help" by James Brown
"The Funky Cypress Hill Sh**" by Cypress Hill
Whatta You Know
"Walk on By" by Isaac Hayes
Hits from the Bong (T-Ray Mix)
"Don't Cha Hear Me Callin' to Ya" by Junior Mance
"Smilin' Billy Suite Pt. II" by Heath Brothers
"Song of the Second Moon" by Tom Dissevelt & Kid Baltan
"Spinning Wheel" by Lonnie Smith
Latin Lingo (Prince Paul Mix)
"Sing a Simple Song" by Sly & the Family Stone
"Improvisation in Fourths" by Dick Hyman 
"Rocket in the Pocket (Live)" by Cerrone
"Symphony No. 5" by Ludwig van Beethoven
When the Shit Goes Down (Diamond D Remix)
"Stratus" by Billy Cobham
"Black Bag" by Carl Holmes

Personnel
B-Real – vocals
Sen Dog – vocals
Leslie Brathwaite – remix assistant 
Call O'Da Wild – performer 
Diamond D – producer 
Sean Evans – art direction, design 
Wyclef Jean – guitar, producer, remixing 
Jerry Bass – producer 
Andy Kravitz – percussion 
Manuel Lecuona – mastering 
DJ Muggs – arranger, mixing 
Joe Nicolo – engineer, mixing 
Darin Prindle – remixing 
Jason Roberts – engineer, mixing 
Jason Stang – photography 
T-Ray – mixing
A Tribe Called Quest – remixing 
Robert "Taj" Walton – engineer

Charts
Album – Billboard (North America)

1996 EPs
Remix EPs
Hip hop EPs
1996 remix albums
Cypress Hill albums
Columbia Records EPs
Ruffhouse Records EPs
Albums produced by DJ Muggs
Albums produced by Diamond D
Columbia Records remix albums
Ruffhouse Records remix albums
Albums produced by Wyclef Jean
Albums produced by Q-Tip (musician)
Albums produced by Prince Paul (producer)